Amsterdam Heavy is a 2011 English action crime film written and directed by Michael Wright. It stars Michael Madsen, Jeroen Post, Alison Carroll, Fajah Lourens, Semmy Schilt, and Alistair Overeem. It was shot in Amsterdam, Netherlands.

Premise
The film tells the story of criminal "JD" who is on a relentless quest for revenge. He smuggles himself back to his hometown Amsterdam. Having arrived there, he goes on a rampage through the Dutch capital to find those who have betrayed him.

Cast
 Michael Madsen as Martin Keele
 Dorien Rose Duinker as Zoe 
 Alison Carroll as Monique 
 Fajah Lourens as Agent Brandt
 Semmy Schilt as Himself
 Alistair Overeem as Himself
 Horace Cohen as Jansen
 Gokhan Saki as Himself
 Mimoun Ouled Radi as De Vries
 Jörgen Raymann as Dr. Sunil

Music
Ray & Anita's single "Nothing 2 Lose" is the lead track for Amsterdam Heavy.

Release
Amsterdam Heavy was released on DVD and Blu-ray Disc in 2011 in the United States. In 2012 it was released in other countries, including the United Kingdom, the Netherlands, Germany, China, Brazil, and France. The single disc DVD contains both full-screen and widescreen versions of the film. It also contains a Making of, Cast interviews and the music video of "Nothing 2 Lose" by Ray & Anita.

References

External links
 
 

2011 films
2011 crime action films
2011 independent films
British crime action films
British independent films
British martial arts films
Films set in Amsterdam
Films shot in Amsterdam
2011 martial arts films
2010s English-language films
2010s British films